Lake Howard is a fresh water lake, located in Winter Haven, Florida. The lake is part of the headwaters of the Peace River watershed. Lake Howard is a prominent lake in Winter Haven's Chain of Lakes. Lake Howard is on the southern chain of lakes. It is connected to Lake Cannon, to the north-west, and Lake May, to the south-east. Lake Howard has a surface area of 624 acres.

The Calusa were the first known people to live along this lake.  The Seminole were later known to live and hunt along the lake.   Lake Howard was first surveyed by Dr. John Westcott in 1849.  He named the lake for his neighbors in Madison County, Florida, the Howard family.   The lake, with its current name, appears in the first United States government maps of the area, published in 1854.

Lake Howard became one of the first areas to be settled by newly arriving American and European settlers.  Some of the oldest homes in the city of Winter Haven are located on the shores of Lake Howard.  Beymer Memorial United Methodist Church, located on the north-east side of the lake, is one of the oldest buildings in Winter Haven.  On the north side of Lake Howard is the residential neighborhood of Interlaken.  This neighborhood is a designated U.S. Historic District, with over 50 homes on the National Register of Historic Places.

By the late 1960s, Lake Howard started to become polluted.  The single biggest problem was that over-flow capacity lines for the Jan Phyll Village Waste Water Treatment Facility, which fed directly into Lake Howard.  This meant that raw sewage was periodically sent directly into the lake.  This problem was corrected in 1977, when the waste facility was re-designed.  In 1980, an important restoration study was done on Lake Howard to improve the water quality.  Over the preceding years, many other major scientific studies were conducted on Lake Howard, often building upon work done in previous studies.  In 1995, Dr T.J. Whitmore conducted a major paleolimnological study on Lake Howard.  By examining sediment core samples, he was able to evaluate historical changes in water levels and water quality in Lake Howard.  Today, through conservation and restoration efforts, by the city, state, and federal government, the water quality of Lake Howard continues to improve.  However, rapid urbanization around the lake threatens its future health.

Lake Howard is situated relatively close to the downtown area of Winter Haven.  Lake Howard Drive, which circles the lake, is a busy thoroughfare in the city.  The lake is surrounded by both residential and commercial properties.  There are two public boats ramps which can be used to access the lake.  The Lake Howard Boat Ramp West is located at the corner of Lake Howard Drive and Avenue B NW, and has a boat ramp and a fishing pier.  Lake Howard Boat Ramp East is located at the corner of Lake Howard Drive and West Central Avenue, and has a boat ramp, fishing pier, parking area, and picnic area.

South Lake Howard Nature Park is located on the south-west side of Lake Howard.  The park is an important role in the restoration of the ecology and water quality of Lake Howard.  It is also plays an important role in the reclamation of natural wetlands within the city of Winter Haven.  The park has multi-use trails, picnic areas, and restrooms.  The park also has a wooden boardwalk running over the wetlands, which provides a good vantage point for observing local wildlife.  Great blue heron, green heron, great egret, snowy egret, osprey, grackle, and red-winged blackbird are a few of the many bird species regularly seen on the lake.  Bald eagles are occasionally seen on the Lake.  The lake supports a healthy population of alligators and other reptiles and amphibians.  Lake Howard is also known as a world class location with fresh water fishing, particularly for large mouth bass and bluegill. The Chain of Lakes Trail, a paved multi-use hiking and biking trail, begins here.

References

Lakes of Polk County, Florida
Winter Haven, Florida